Peruvannamuzhi dam, also known as Kuttiady (Id) Dam, is a dam built on the Kuttiady River at Peruvannamuzhi in Chakkittapara Grama Panchayath in Kozhikode district, Kerala. It is 16  km away from Kuttiady town and it is 55 km from Kozhikode town.  It was constructed as part of the Kuttiady irrigation project. The project consists of a masonry dam across Kuttiyady River and 13 earth dams to maximize the storage of the reservoir. The construction of this project started in 1962 and was commissioned in 1973.

The reservoir of this dam is located in Chakittapara and Koorachundu panchayats. There are speed boat and tower boat facilities. It is a popular tourist attraction of Kozhikode district. The Peruvannamuzhi Wildlife Sanctuary is also known as Malabar Wildlife Sanctuary.

Power generation 
In the future, Kerala State Electricity Board plans to generate a small amount of power using 6 MW turbines. Annual production is expected to be 24.7 MU.

Features of the project
 Project name: Kuttiyadi (Peruvannamoozhi) Dam Irrigation project
 Location: Near Kozhikode City
 Latitude: 11 o 35'47.76" North
 Longitude: 75 o 49'24.6" East
 Purpose: Irrigation and water supply.
 Date of commencement: 1962
 Date of completion: 6 February 1973
 Project Identification Code (PIC): KL 07 MH 0026
Project Benefits
 Irrigation benefits
 Gross Command Area: 36000 Ha
 Cultivable command area: 14569 Ha
 Annual irrigation potential: 10568 Ha
 Water Supply Benefits
 Annual Water supply: 71.54 MCM
 Flood Protection area: 8000 Ha
 Area Benefitted: 24000 Ha
Details of the Dam
 Dam type: Masonry Dam
 Total Length: 
 Top width: 
 Elevation of top: + 46 .85 m above MSL
 Height of the dam: 
 Saddle Dams: 13 numbers - Homogenous rolled earth
Saddle Dams
 Saddle Dam 1 Type: 13Nos. - Homogenous rolled earth
 Total Length of the Saddle dam 
 Top width of Saddle Dam(m): 
 Elevation of top of Saddle Dam (m): +46.85 MSL
 Height of Saddle Dam:
 Main Spillway
 Type of Spillway: Ogee
 Length of spillway: 
 Location of spillway: Chainage 63 meters to 119.30 meters
 Spillway crest level: +38.44 meters
 Number of bays: 4
 Type of Spillway gates: Radial
 Width of spillway gate: 
 Height of spillway gate: 
Reservoir
 Catchment area: 108.78 square kilometers
 Maximum water level: +44.61 meters
 Full Reservoir level: +44.41 meters
 Dead Storage level:

Gallery

References 

Dams in Kerala
Buildings and structures in Kozhikode district
Dams completed in 1973
1973 establishments in Kerala
20th-century architecture in India